Philipp Kühn (born 2 September 1992) is a German professional footballer who plays as a goalkeeper for VfL Osnabrück.

References

External links

Living people
1992 births
Association football goalkeepers
German footballers
Rot Weiss Ahlen players
SV Sandhausen players
Rot-Weiß Oberhausen players
SV Drochtersen/Assel players
VfL Osnabrück players
2. Bundesliga players
3. Liga players
Regionalliga players